Chalcosia is a genus of moths in the family Zygaenidae.

Species
Chalcosia affinis (Guérin-Méneville, 1843)
Chalcosia alpherakyi Leech, 1898
Chalcosia coliadoides 
Chalcosia contradicta Inoue, 1991
Chalcosia flavicollis Jordan, 1907
Chalcosia formosana Matsumura, 1911
Chalcosia nympha Moore, 1878
Chalcosia pectinicornis (Linnaeus, 1758)
Chalcosia pretiosa Walker, [1865]
Chalcosia venosa Walker, 1854
Chalcosia zehma Herrich-Schäffer, [1853]

References

Chalcosiinae
Zygaenidae genera